The 37th Edition Vuelta a España (Tour of Spain), a long-distance bicycle stage race and one of the three grand tours, was held from 20 April to 9 May 1982.

The Reynolds team controlled the race after team leader Ángel Arroyo took the leader's jersey on the tenth stage. Arroyo kept the jersey until the finish of the race where he won the final individual time trial. Arroyo won the grand tour ahead of Marino Lejarreta and Michel Pollentier. However 48 hours after his win, it emerged that in the doping control that was conducted after the stage 17 Arroyo tested positive. Three other riders also failed the doping test after stage 17: Alberto Fernández, Vicente Belda and Pedro Muñoz.

The four riders were said to have tested positive for Methylphenidate (which is also known as Ritalin) a stimulant. Methylphenidate was a popular drug for doping in cycling at that time.
Arroyo and his team denied the allegations and asked for a second analysis of the sample. The B analysis confirmed the first positive test. 
Arroyo was assigned a 10-minute penalty and stripped of his Vuelta win which was given to Lejarreta. With the 10-minute penalty Arroyo went down to 13th place in the classification. 
The disqualification of the winner of the Vuelta has been called the worst scandal that has ever hit the race on the official La Vuelta website.

Teams and riders

Route

Results

Final General Classification

References

 
1982 in road cycling
1982
1982 in Spanish sport
April 1982 sports events in Europe
May 1982 sports events in Europe
1982 Super Prestige Pernod